Best of the Chrysalis Years is a compilation album made up of tracks from the Ramones' five albums on Chrysalis Records (UK): Brain Drain, Mondo Bizarro, Acid Eaters, ¡Adios Amigos!, and Loco Live. It was released on May 28, 2002, by EMI International. The album was re-released in 2004 with a new track listing as The Best of The Ramones.

Best of the Chrysalis Years was released nine days before Ramones bassist Dee Dee Ramone's death.

Track listing 
 "Pet Semetary" - (Dee Dee Ramone/Daniel Rey)
 "Don't Bust My Chops" - (Dee Dee Ramone/Joey Ramone/Daniel Rey)
 "Ignorance Is Bliss" - (Joey Ramone/Andy Shernoff)
 "Sheena Is a Punk Rocker (live)" - (Joey Ramone)
 "Teenage Lobotomy (live)" - (The Ramones)
 "Surfin' Bird (live)" - (Al Frazier/Sonny Harris/Carl White/Turner Wilson)
 "Poison Heart" - (Dee Dee Ramone/Daniel Rey)
 "Anxiety" - (Marky Ramone/Skinny Bones)
 "Take It as It Comes" - (Jim Morrison/John Densmore/Robby Krieger/Ray Manzarek)
 "Cretin Hop (live)" - (The Ramones)
 "Rockaway Beach (live)" - (Dee Dee Ramone)
 "I Wanna Be Sedated (live)" - (Joey Ramone)
 "Out of Time" - (Mick Jagger/Keith Richards)
 "Somebody to Love" - (Darby Slick)
 "Rock And Roll Radio (Live)" - (Joey Ramone)
 "Blitzkrieg Bop (live)" - (Tommy Ramone/Dee Dee Ramone)
 "I Don't Wanna Grow Up" - (Tom Waits/Kathleen Brennan)
 "Got a Lot to Say" - (C.J. Ramone)

References

Albums produced by Ed Stasium
Albums produced by Daniel Rey
Albums produced by Jean Beauvoir
Albums produced by Bill Laswell
2002 compilation albums
Chrysalis Records compilation albums
Ramones compilation albums